The Task Force on the Implementation of Amendment 64 was a task force of the U.S. State of Colorado charged with considering and resolving a number of policy, legal and procedural issues relating to Colorado Amendment 64, which allows for personal use and regulation of marijuana.

On 10 December 2012 Governor Hickenlooper signed Executive Order B 2012-004 to create the Task Force to "consider and resolve a number of policy, legal and procedural issues". The task force had a deadline of February 28 to submit its proposals, and on March 13, 2013 issued 58 recommendations on how recreational pot should be grown, sold and taxed in the state.

Its membership was composed of:

 Jack Finlaw, Co-Chair: Governor's Chief Legal Counsel
 Barbara Brohl, Co-Chair: Executive Director of the Colorado Department of Revenue
 Rep. Dan Pabon, appointed by the incoming Speaker of the House
 Sen. Cheri Jahn, appointed by the incoming President of the Senate
 Newly elected Rep. Dan Nordberg, appointed by the incoming House Minority Leader
 Newly elected Sen. Vicki Marble, appointed by the incoming Senate Minority Leader
 David Blake, representing the Colorado Attorney General
 Kevin Bommer, representing the Colorado Municipal League
 Eric Bergman, representing Colorado Counties Inc.
 Chris Urbina, the Executive Director of the Colorado Department of Public Health and Environment
 James Davis, the Executive Director of the Colorado Department of Public Safety
 John Salazar, the Colorado Commissioner of Agriculture
 Ron Kammerzell, the Senior Director responsible for the Colorado Medical Marijuana Enforcement Division
 Christian Sederberg, representing the campaign to pass Amendment 64
 Meg Sanders, representing the medical marijuana dispensary and cultivation industry
 Craig Small, representing marijuana consumers
 Sam Kamin, a person with expertise in legal issues related to the legalization of marijuana
 Dr. Christian Thurstone, a person with expertise in the treatment of marijuana addiction
 Charles Garcia, representing the Colorado Commission on Criminal and Juvenile Justice
 Larry Abrahamson, representing the Colorado District Attorney's Council
 Brian Connors, representing the Colorado State Public Defender
 Daniel Zook, an at-large member from outside of the Denver area
 Tamra Ward, representing the interests of employers
 Mike Cerbo, representing the interests of employees

References 

2012 cannabis law reform
State agencies of Colorado